The 2021 World trials season consisted of six trials events with six main classes: Trial GP, Trial2, Trial 125cc, Trial E-Cup, Women's Trial and Women's Trial2.

The X-Trial season was contested over two events in November and was won by Toni Bou, who won both events and claimed his 15th consecutive title.

Season summary
Toni Bou won his 15th consecutive Trial and X-Trial championships.

Laia Sanz returned to Trials after 7 years and won her 14th title.

2021 World trials season calendar

Trial GP final standings

{|
|

Women's Trial final standings 

{|
|

Trial E-Cup final standings 

{|
|

2021 World X-Trials season calendar

X-Trial final standings 

{|
|

References

2021
2021 in motorcycle sport